Mole Lake, Wisconsin is a census-designated place located in the town of Nashville in Forest County, Wisconsin, United States.

Description
The community is located on Wisconsin Highway 55 in the Mole Lake Indian Reservation. As of the 2010 census, its population is 435. It is named after the Mole Lake tribe. The tribe's Mole Lake Casino is located in the community.

Images

See also
 List of census-designated places in Wisconsin

References

See also

Census-designated places in Wisconsin
Census-designated places in Forest County, Wisconsin